The 1968 Canadian Ladies Curling Association Championship the Canadian women's curling championship was held from February 26 to March 1, 1968 at the St. James Civic Centre in St. James, Manitoba (now part of Winnipeg).

Alberta and British Columbia both finished round robin play tied for first with 7–2 records, necessitating a tiebreaker playoff between the two teams to determine the championship. Team Alberta, who was skipped by Hazel Jamison captured the championship after defeating BC in the tiebreaker 11–4. This was Alberta's second championship overall as they previously won in 1966. This was the first time in which a tiebreaker playoff determined the women's championship as the previous three tiebreaker playoffs (1961, 1963, and 1964) were to determine second place.

This championship would set a record for the most extra ends games in one tournament with five.

Event Summary
Heading into the Wednesday evening draw (Draw 7), four teams had a shot of winning the championship as British Columbia and Manitoba were tied for first at 5–1, Alberta and Saskatchewan tied for third at 4–2. 

Everything held status quo in the Wednesday evening draw with BC defeating New Brunswick 9–4, Alberta beating Newfoundland 10–2, Saskatchewan beating Prince Edward Island 8–7, and Manitoba defeating Ontario 8–7 in an extra end. With BC still having to face Manitoba and Alberta in both Friday draws, things remained wide open heading into the final day of round robin play.

The penultimate draw on Thursday morning would end up seeing more clarity on whom would be in contention heading into the final draw on Thursday evening. The first one to fall was Saskatchewan as they lost to New Brunswick 6–4, thus eliminating Saskatchewan from championship contention. Alberta would stay alive as they used scored five in the second end and never looked back in their 9–5 victory over Quebec. Meanwhile, Manitoba appeared to have a stranglehold in their matchup with BC as they lead 6–2 through six ends. However, BC would score five in the last four ends to win 7–6 and took over sole possession of first place. 

The final draw would have huge implications, especially with the Alberta vs. BC matchup. If BC won, then they'd clinch the title outright, while an Alberta win would force a tiebreaker playoff. If both Alberta and Manitoba won, then a three-way tiebreaker would determine the championship. The latter scenario wouldn't come to fruition as Manitoba blew yet another lead (this time 7–5) after six ends as New Brunswick scored seven in the last four ends to win 12–7 and eliminate Manitoba. 

It then appeared that BC would come away with the title as they lead Alberta after six ends 7–2. However that would change quickly as Alberta scored five in the seventh end to tie the game. The two teams traded singles in the next two ends with things all knotted up at 8 heading into the final end with BC having hammer. But despite this, Alberta would go onto steal one to win 9–8, thus forcing a tiebreaker playoff on Friday morning to determine the championship.

In the rematch between Alberta and BC on Friday morning, Alberta would score singles in each of the first three ends to jump out to a 3–0 lead. BC would cut Alberta's lead down to one with two in the fourth. But that was as close as BC would get as Alberta put the game away with five in the fifth and a steal of two in the sixth to take a commanding 10–2 lead and eventually capture the championship 11–4 after BC conceded the tenth end.

Teams
The teams are listed as follows:

Round robin standings
Final Round Robin standings

Round robin results
All draw times are listed in Central Standard Time (UTC−06:00).

Draw 1 
Monday, February 26, 2:30 pm

Draw 2 
Monday, February 26, 8:00 pm

Draw 3 
Tuesday, February 27, 9:30 am

Draw 4 
Tuesday, February 27, 8:00 pm

Draw 5 
Wednesday, February 28, 9:30 am

Draw 6 
Wednesday, February 28, 2:30 pm

Draw 7 
Wednesday, February 28, 8:00 pm

Draw 8 
Thursday, February 29, 9:30 am

Draw 9 
Thursday, February 29, 8:00 pm

Tiebreaker
Friday, March 1, 9:30 am

References

Canadian Ladies Curling Association Championship, 1968
Scotties Tournament of Hearts
Curling competitions in Winnipeg
St. James, Winnipeg
Canadian Ladies Curling Association Championship
Canadian Ladies Curling Association Championship
Canadian Ladies Curling Association Championship
Canadian Ladies Curling Association Championship
Canadian Ladies Curling Association Championship